The Sara Lee Classic was a golf tournament on the LPGA Tour from 1988 to 2002. It was played at Hermitage Golf Course in Old Hickory, Tennessee from 1988 to 1999. In 2000, the tournament moved to the Legends Club of Tennessee in Franklin, Tennessee and changed its name to the Electrolux USA Championship. The tournament was hosted by singers Vince Gill and Amy Grant in its final three years.

Winners
Aerus Electrolux USA Championship Hosted by Vince Gill and Amy Grant
2002 Annika Sörenstam

Electrolux USA Championship Hosted by Vince Gill and Amy Grant
2001 Juli Inkster
2000 Pat Hurst

Sara Lee Classic
1999 Meg Mallon
1998 Barb Mucha
1997 Terry-Jo Myers
1996 Meg Mallon
1995 Michelle McGann
1994 Laura Davies
1993 Meg Mallon
1992 Maggie Will
1991 Nancy Lopez
1990 Ayako Okamoto
1989 Kathy Postlewait
1988 Patti Rizzo

Tournament highlights

1988: The inaugural version of the tournament is decided in a sudden death playoff involving four players. Patti Rizzo birdies the fifth extra hole to defeat Sherri Turner after Tammie Green and Kim Williams had previously dropped out on the playoff's first hole.
1991: Nancy Lopez, pregnant with her third child, wins by two shots over Kris Monaghan.
1995: Michelle McGann wins on the LPGA Tour for the first time. She finished one shot ahead of defending champion Laura Davies.
2002: Annika Sörenstam wins the last edition of the tournament by shooting a final round 64 to finish one shot ahead of Pat Hurst. Hurst came to the tournament's final hole tied for the lead but hit a ball into the water leading to a bogey.

1992 fire
Three-time LPGA Tour winner Cathy Gerring suffered severe burns after finishing her second round of play in that year's Sara Lee Classic. Gerring was in a buffet line at a tournament hospitality tent when a catering employee Mike Singleton tried to restart a fire with denatured alcohol. Flames erupted, engulfing Gerring from the waist up. Gerring was immediately taken to a nearby burn unit.

Gerring did not play pro golf again until 1996, but never recovered her form. Three years after the accident, Gerring settled a lawsuit she filed against the catering company whose employee caused the fire to happen.

References

External links
Tournament results (1988-99) at Golfobserver.com
Tournament results (2000-02) at Golfobserver.com
Hermitage Golf Course

Former LPGA Tour events
Golf in Tennessee
Sports competitions  in Nashville, Tennessee
1988 establishments in Tennessee
2002 disestablishments in Tennessee
Recurring sporting events established in 1988
Recurring sporting events disestablished in 2002
History of women in Tennessee